Panuwat Yimsa-ngar (born January 16, 1982) is a retired professional footballer from Thailand.

Honours

Club
Ratchaburi F.C.
 Thai Division 1 League Champions (1) : 2012

References

External links

1982 births
Living people
Panuwat Yimsa-ngar
Panuwat Yimsa-ngar
Association football midfielders
Panuwat Yimsa-ngar
Panuwat Yimsa-ngar
Panuwat Yimsa-ngar
Panuwat Yimsa-ngar
Panuwat Yimsa-ngar
Panuwat Yimsa-ngar
Panuwat Yimsa-ngar